Wyoming Highway 196 (WYO 196) is a  north–south Wyoming State Road that travels through central Johnson County, closely paralleling Interstate 25 (I-25). WYO 196 travels from I-25 and U.S. Route 87 (US 87) at exit 249 south of Kaycee to I-25 Business/US 87 Business in Buffalo near Exit 298.

Route description
Highway 196 heads north as it parallels I-25 and enters the town of Kaycee from the south assuming the name Nolan Avenue through the community. The western terminus of Wyoming Highway 192 (Sussex Road) and the eastern terminus of Wyoming Highway 191 (Mayoworth Road) is intersected in the community. Exit 254 of Interstate 25 can be accessed via WYO 191. WYO 196 continues north out of Kaycee, and north of there crosses under I-25/US 87 and parallels the highway to the west. Along its routing to Buffalo, no major highways are intersected besides local roadways, some of which provide access to the exits of I-25/US 87 between Kaycee and Buffalo.

WYO 196 enters the city of Buffalo from the south and ends at Interstate 25 Business/US 87 Business (S. Main Street). Exit 298 of I-25/US 87 can be accessed via I-25 BUS/US 87 BUS south.

History
Wyoming Highway 196 is the former routing of U.S. Route 87 prior to realignment along Interstate 25.

Major intersections

References

External links 

Wyoming State Routes 100-199
WYO 196 - I-25/US 87 to WYO 191/WYO 192
WYO 196 - WYO 191/WYO 192 to I-25 BUS/US 87 BUS
Kaycee, WY Chamber of Commerce website
Buffalo, WY website

Transportation in Johnson County, Wyoming
196
U.S. Route 87
Buffalo, Wyoming